Graeme William Walter Barker,  (born 23 October 1946) is a British archaeologist, notable for his work on the Italian Bronze Age, the Roman occupation of Libya, and landscape archaeology.

Early life and education
Barker was born on 23 October 1946. He was educated at Alleyn's School, then a direct grant grammar school in Dulwich. He studied for the classical tripos at St John's College, Cambridge, graduating with a Bachelor of Arts (BA) degree; as per tradition, his BA was promoted to a Master of Arts (MA Cantab) degree. He remained at Cambridge to take his Doctor of Philosophy (PhD) degree, which he completed in 1973 with a doctoral thesis titled "Prehistoric economies and cultures in Central Italy.".

Academic career
In 1972, Barker joined the University of Sheffield as a lecturer in prehistory and archaeology. He was promoted to senior lecturer in 1981, and was additionally Director of the British School at Rome from 1984.

In 1988, Barker was appointed Professor of Archaeology in the Department of Archaeology at the University of Leicester, which became the School of Archaeological Studies in 1990 and the School of Archaeology and Ancient History in 2001. Barker was elected to the Disney Professorship of Archaeology at the University of Cambridge in 2004, and is a fellow of St John's College, Cambridge. He retired from the Disney chair at the end of September 2014.

In April 2015, he and his team announced the discovery of neanderthal skeletons in the Shanidar Cave located north of Erbil.

Honours
In 2005, Barker was, with Israel Finkelstein, joint winner of the Dan David Prize. He was elected Fellow of the British Academy (FBA) in 1999.

He was appointed Commander of the Order of the British Empire (CBE) in the 2015 New Year Honours for services to archaeology.

References

External links
Graeme Barker's home page
2005 Dan David Prize laureate
University of Cambridge press release

1946 births
English archaeologists
Fellows of St John's College, Cambridge
Alumni of St John's College, Cambridge
Academics of the University of Leicester
Living people
Fellows of the British Academy
Commanders of the Order of the British Empire
People educated at Alleyn's School
Disney Professors of Archaeology